Rene Nicklisch (born 31 March 1976) is a German former professional tennis player.

Biography
Nicklisch was born in Salzkotten and performed well as a junior, most notably winning the 16 and Under title at the Orange Bowl in 1992, which he secured with a win in the final over Rogier Wassen. He also represented Germany in the Junior Davis Cup in 1992 when they finished runners-up to France.

On the professional tour he made it to 246 in the world. He played in the main draw of the 1993 Gerry Weber Open as a wildcard and lost in the first round to seventh seed Marcos Ondruska. In 1999 he won two Challenger titles, the singles at Aschaffenburg and doubles at Sylt. His victory in the Aschaffenburg Challenger included wins from the quarter-final stage over Radek Štěpánek, Alexander Popp and then Luis Horna in the final. At the 2000 BMW Open he made a return to an ATP Tour main draw by featuring the men's doubles competition with Tomas Nydahl. They were beaten in the first round by eventual champions David Adams and John-Laffnie de Jager.

Challenger titles

Singles: (1)

Doubles: (1)

References

External links
 
 

1976 births
Living people
German male tennis players
People from Salzkotten
Sportspeople from Detmold (region)
Tennis people from North Rhine-Westphalia